Veli Mothwa (born 12 February 1991) is a South African soccer player who plays as a goalkeeper for South African Premier Division side AmaZulu and the South African national team.

International career
He made his debut for South Africa on 6 July 2021 in a 2021 COSAFA Cup game against Botswana. South Africa won the tournament, and Mothwa was selected as best goalkeeper, as he kept the clean sheet in all 5 games he played, including the final against Senegal.

References

Living people
1991 births
South African soccer players
South Africa international soccer players
Association football goalkeepers
Baroka F.C. players
Chippa United F.C. players
AmaZulu F.C. players
South African Premier Division players
National First Division players